Sedona Red Rock High School is a high school in Sedona, Arizona. It is part of the Sedona-Oak Creek Unified School District.

References

External links
 
 2009 construction homepage

Public high schools in Arizona
Schools in Yavapai County, Arizona
Sedona, Arizona